Brent James Livermore OAM (born 5 July 1976 in Grafton, New South Wales) is a field hockey midfielder from Australia. He was first selected in the Australian team in 1997, and was awarded the Kookaburras player of the year award in 2001. He was also nominated of the FIH Player of the Year awards in 2002 and 2005. He has played over 300 matches for the Australian team, and has scored 30 international goals. He plays for the NSW Waratahs in the Australian Hockey League.

Brent Livermore won the gold medal with the Kooraburras at the 2004 Olympics, but was omitted from the 2008 Olympic squad that placed third in Beijing.

In the World Series Hockey organized by the Indian Hockey Federation and Nimbus Sport, Brent Livermore captains the Chennai Cheetahs, a Chennai-based Hockey team.

After a brief hiatus from the sport, Livermore returned to coach the NSWIS male team, the U21 NSW Men's team, and the NSW Waratahs team at their respective tournaments. He has returned to the pitch, as the captain-coach of team NSWIS at the ripe age of 42, in the exhibition match against Odisha. The team lost the first match 5–1.

International tournaments
 1997 – Champions Trophy, Adelaide (2nd place)
 1998 – Commonwealth Games, Kuala Lumpur (1st place)
 1998 – Champions Trophy, Lahore (3rd place)
 1999 – Champions Trophy, Brisbane (1st place)
 2000 – Champions Trophy, Amstelveen (5th place)
 2000 – Olympic Games, Sydney (3rd place)
 2001 – Champions Trophy, Rotterdam (2nd place)
 2002 – World Cup, Kuala Lumpur (2nd place)
 2002 – Commonwealth Games, Manchester (1st place)
 2002 – Champions Trophy, Cologne (5th place)
 2003 – Champions Trophy, Amstelveen (2nd place)
 2004 – Olympic Games, Athens (1st place)
 2005 – Champions Trophy, Chennai (1st place)
 2006 – Commonwealth Games, Melbourne (1st place)
 2006 – Champions Trophy, Terrassa (4th place)
 2006 – World Cup, Mönchengladbach (2nd place)
 2007 – Champions Trophy, Kuala Lumpur (2nd place)
 2009 – Champions Trophy, Kuala Lumpur (1st place)
 2018 – 2018 ODISHA XI vs NSWIS XI - Exhibition Tournament, Odisha (2nd place)

References

External links

 Brent Livermore Official Page
 Profile on Hockey Australia

1976 births
Australian male field hockey players
Male field hockey midfielders
Field hockey players at the 1998 Commonwealth Games
Field hockey players at the 2000 Summer Olympics
Field hockey players at the 2002 Commonwealth Games
2002 Men's Hockey World Cup players
Field hockey players at the 2004 Summer Olympics
Field hockey players at the 2006 Commonwealth Games
2006 Men's Hockey World Cup players
Living people
Recipients of the Medal of the Order of Australia
Olympic field hockey players of Australia
Olympic gold medalists for Australia
Olympic bronze medalists for Australia
Commonwealth Games gold medallists for Australia
Olympic medalists in field hockey
World Series Hockey players
Medalists at the 2004 Summer Olympics
Medalists at the 2000 Summer Olympics
Commonwealth Games medallists in field hockey
People from Grafton, New South Wales
Sportsmen from New South Wales
Medallists at the 1998 Commonwealth Games
Medallists at the 2002 Commonwealth Games
Medallists at the 2006 Commonwealth Games